"Summer Nights" is a song recorded by American country music group Rascal Flatts.  It was written by the band's lead singer Gary LeVox, along with Brett James and busbee.  It was released in May 2009 as the second single from their sixth studio album Unstoppable.

Content
"Summer Nights" is an up-tempo country song celebrating summertime by inviting others to join in a party.

Critical reception
Matt Bjorke of Roughstock said that the song was "light hearted" and "feel-good" and would appeal to Rascal Flatts' fans, but said that he did not think that it would be well received by those who dislike the band's mainstream sound. Mandi Byerly of Entertainment Weekly said that the song sounded like it came from the High School Musical soundtrack.

Chart performance
"Summer Nights" debuted at number 57 on the Billboard Hot Country Songs chart dated for April 18, 2009, based on unsolicited airplay received while their then-current single "Here Comes Goodbye" was climbing the charts. "Summer Nights" held this position for two weeks before falling from the charts. It re-entered at number 53 on the same chart dated for May 16, 2009, and entered Top 40 at number 30 two weeks later. The song peaked at number 2 on the U.S. Billboard Hot Country Songs chart. The song did peak at number one on the Canadian country charts.

Charts

Weekly charts

Year-end charts

References

Rascal Flatts songs
2009 singles
Songs written by Brett James
Song recordings produced by Dann Huff
Music videos directed by Shaun Silva
Lyric Street Records singles
Songs written by busbee
Songs written by Gary LeVox
2009 songs